Koptsevo is a rural locality (a village) in Markovskoye Rural Settlement, Vologodsky District, Vologda Oblast, Russia. The population was 1 as of 2002.

Geography 
Koptsevo is located 21 km southeast of Vologda (the district's administrative centre) by road. Tishinovo is the nearest rural locality.

References 

Rural localities in Vologodsky District